Haplochromis angustifrons is a species of cichlid endemic to Uganda where it is found in Lake George, Lake Edward and the Kazinga Channel.  This species reaches a length of  SL.

References

Angustifrons
Endemic freshwater fish of Uganda
Fish described in 1914
Taxonomy articles created by Polbot